Kampong Sengkarai is a village in Tutong District, Brunei, on the outskirts of the district town Pekan Tutong. The population was 1,989 in 2016. It is one of the villages within Mukim Pekan Tutong.

Facilities 
Pengiran Dipa Negara Pengiran Jaya Sengkarai Primary School is the village primary school, whereas Sengkarai Religious School is the village school for the country's Islamic religious primary education.

Pengiran Anak Haji Mohamed Alam Mosque is the village mosque; it was inaugurated on 7 April 2017 by Sultan Hassanal Bolkiah and can accommodate 1000 worshippers. The mosque has been built to replace , the former village mosque built in 1981 which could no longer accommodate the growing number of worshippers.

References 

Sengkarai